Gisele Lima de Oliveira (born 1 August 1980 in Porto Alegre, Rio Grande do Sul) is a Brazilian triple jumper.

Career
She finished eighth in the 2008 World Athletics Final, and also competed at the 2008 Olympic Games without reaching the final.

Personal bests
Her personal best jump is 14.28 metres, achieved in April 2008 in São Paulo. She also has 6.66 metres in the long jump, achieved in May 2008 in Cochabamba.
Long jump: 6.66 m (wind: +0.0 m/s) –  Cochabamba, 31 May 2008
Triple jump: 14.28 m (wind: -0.9 m/s) –  São Paulo, 16 April 2008

Achievements

References

External links

Tilastopaja biography

1980 births
Living people
Brazilian female triple jumpers
Athletes (track and field) at the 2008 Summer Olympics
Olympic athletes of Brazil
Clemson Tigers women's track and field athletes
South American Games silver medalists for Brazil
South American Games medalists in athletics
Competitors at the 2014 South American Games
Sportspeople from Porto Alegre
20th-century Brazilian women
21st-century Brazilian women